The 2014–15 Army Black Knights women's basketball team represented the United States Military Academy during the 2014–15 NCAA Division I women's basketball season. The Black Knights, led by ninth year head coach Dave Magarity, played their home games at Christl Arena and were members of the Patriot League. They finished the season 23–7, 14–4 in Patriot League play to finish in second place. They advance semifinals of the Patriot League women's tournament where they lost to Lehigh. They were invited to the Women's National Invitation Tournament where they lost in the first round to St. John's.

Roster

Schedule

|-
!colspan=9 style="background:#000000; color:#D6C499;"| Non-conference regular season

|-
!colspan=9 style="background:#000000; color:#D6C499;"| Conference regular season
|-
!colspan=9 style="background:#000000; color:#D6C499;"| Patriot League Tournament
|-
!colspan=9 style="background:#000000; color:#D6C499;"| WNIT

See also
2014–15 Army Black Knights men's basketball team

References

Army
Army Black Knights women's basketball seasons
2014 in sports in New York (state)
2015 in sports in New York (state)